Euthymia may refer to:
 Euthymia (medicine), a calm mental state in psychology and psychiatry
 Euthymia (philosophy), a concept in philosophy
 Euphrosyne (mythology) or Euthymia, a Greek goddess
 Euthymia (grasshopper), a genus of grasshoppers in the subfamily Hemiacridinae